Fyllingsdalen is a borough of the city of Bergen in Vestland county, Norway.  The borough is located southwest of the city centre in the Fyllingsdalen valley, west of the mountain Løvstakken.  The neighbourhoods of Fyllingsdalen mainly consist of fairly large apartment buildings with little industry or commerce.

The valley's name comes from the farm name "Fyllingen" (from Old Norse: 'fylingr', related to Old Norse 'fæla' - hide/hidden) and "dale" (from Old Norse: 'dalr' - valley) and is attested in 1437 as "Fylingir" . (see also Sandnes/Stemshaug: Norsk Stadnamnleksikon, Samlaget, Oslo 1990). See Fylingdales.

History
In 1955, Bergen municipality, lacking land to build on, annexed the valley, which at the time had a population of approximately 1,600. Prior to that time, Fyllingsdalen had belonged to the municipality of Fana, which was later merged into Bergen as well.

The Puddefjord Bridge (opened in 1956) and the Løvstakken Tunnel (opened in 1968) contributed greatly to the growth of the borough by providing a highway from the valley directly into the centre of the city of Bergen.

Fyllingsdalen was constructed as a modern commuter town, but saw some commercial activity develop in the late 20th century.  The main service centre for the borough is the shopping centre Oasen, opened in 1971.

Culture and education

Fyllingsdalen contains three churches, several elementary schools and lower secondary schools (including Varden skole), one upper secondary school and two nursing homes, as well as police stations, surgeries, pharmacies, and post offices.

Sports arenas include Varden Amfi.

Transportation
The Knappe Tunnel runs from Dolviken (in Ytrebygda borough to the south) to Fyllingsdalen, and on to Laksevåg borough in the north.

Villages and neighborhoods
The villages and neighborhoods in the borough include: Bønestoppen, Nedre Fyllingen, Sælen, and Traudalen.

Famous residents
Gabrielle Leithaug (singer)
Cecilie Leganger (handball player)
Inge Ludviksen (football player)
Tommy Le (Professional Dota 2 player for Team Liquid)

References

Boroughs of Bergen